Jungle Siren is a 1942 American film directed by Sam Newfield.

Cast 
Ann Corio as Kuhlaya
Buster Crabbe as Captain Gary Hart
Evelyn Wahl as Frau Anna Lukas
Paul Bryar as Sergeant Mike Jenkins
Milton Kibbee as Dr. Thomas Harrigan
Arno Frey as Herr George Lukas
Jess Lee Brooks as Chief Selangi
Manart Kippen as Major Renault - Commandant
James Adamson as Johnny - a Native
Greco as himself, a chimpanzee

Soundtrack 
Ann Corio - "Song of the Jungle" (Written by Johnny Lange and Lew Porter)

External links 

1942 films
1942 adventure films
American black-and-white films
1940s romance films
American World War II films
Producers Releasing Corporation films
Jungle girls
1940s English-language films
Films directed by Sam Newfield